Stranger Things Have Happened is the second studio album of jazz standards by singer Justin Guarini that was released in 2005.

Critical reception 

Stephen Erlewine at AllMusic wrote that this album was the American Idol runner-up's attempt to reinvent himself after the failure of the movie From Justin to Kelly. The result is "loungey, Am-Idol-styled vocal jazz, but Stranger Things Have Happened is vocal jazz all the same...Guarini has genuine, natural charisma as a supper club-styled singer, and that charisma when contrasted with his band's jazz chops has a nice, relaxed appeal." Despite its weaknesses, the album was "a surprisingly successful reinvention."

Track listing

References 

2005 albums
Justin Guarini albums
Jazz albums by American artists
Covers albums